DocuSign Tower, previously the Wells Fargo Center, is a skyscraper in Seattle, in the U.S. state of Washington. The design work was done by The McKinley Architects, and it was owned by Chicago-based EQ Office.

In 2013, the building was purchased by Canada's Ivanhoé Cambridge from Beacon Capital Partners of Boston. The building was renamed after First Interstate Bancorp was taken over by Wells Fargo in 1996. DocuSign took over naming rights in 2020 after expanding their lease within the building, which began in 2015.

The exterior façade is composed of a six-sided, steel-framed tower that features a combination of tinted continuous double-glazed glass and polished spring rose granite panels. As is common with buildings in downtown Seattle, DocuSign Tower rests on a slope. The eastern entrance facing Third Avenue is slightly more than two stories higher than the Western side facing Second Avenue. On the west side, the building has a public hill-climb on two flights of outdoor escalators that were encased in clear tubes until 2006 when they were updated with a simpler, yet more modern glass roof. The building has three levels of outdoor plazas. Several retail spaces face the west plaza.

The site was previously occupied by the 12-story Olympic National Life building, which was demolished by implosion on the morning of Sunday,  It was the first demolition by implosion in downtown  One of the city's first steel skyscrapers, it was built in 1906 and was also known as the American Savings Bank and the

See also
List of tallest buildings in Seattle

References

1983 establishments in Washington (state)
Leadership in Energy and Environmental Design gold certified buildings
Office buildings completed in 1983
Skyscraper office buildings in Seattle
Wells Fargo buildings